Mount Jefferson is a mountain located in Schoharie County of New York.
Mount Jefferson is the source of two major rivers being the Delaware, and Susquehanna. It is also a tributary to the Hudson River, however not the source.

References

Mountains of Schoharie County, New York
Mountains of New York (state)